The Azilal Formation (historically Toundute Continental Series and Wazzant Formation) is a geological unit in the Azilal and Ouarzazate provinces of the High Atlas mountains of Morocco. It covers the Latest Pliensbachian to early Aalenian stages of the Jurassic period. It is a terrestrial deposit that overlies marine dolomites of equivalent age to the Budoš Limestone of Montenegro or the Marne di Monte Serrone of Italy. Dinosaur remains, such as the sauropod Tazoudasaurus and the basal ceratosaur Berberosaurus are known from the unit, along with several undescribed genera.

The units in the group have been considered individual in the past, a division of the so-called "couches rouges" (red layers), and subdivided by a supposed geological scale. The strata of the group extend toward the Central High Atlas, covering different anticlines and topographic accidents along the mountain range. New studies, however, have suggested that the strata is coeval in age, and should be referred to as a unique unit. The formation is best considered an alluvial environment occasionally interrupted by shallow marine incursions (or tidal flat setting) and marks a dramatic decrease in carbonate productivity under increasing terrigenous sedimentation. The Azilal Formation consists mainly of claystones rich in continental plant debris and laminated microbial facies. The Toarcic High Atlas is divided into five units: the continental layers with paralic deposits belong to the Azilal, along the shoreface layers of the Tagoudite Formation and Tafraout Formation, both connected with the offshore Ait Athmane Formation and the deeper shelf deposits of the Agoudim 1 Formation.

Geology 
This formation is apparent in the area of the provincial capital of Azilal (Berber languages: ⴰⵣⵉⵍⴰⵍ, Arabic: أزيلال) in central Morocco. The central High Atlas mountains of Morocco belong to a double-vergent mountain belt system, whose origin was linked with Cenozoic shortening & inversion of a local Triassic–Jurassic rift. Its geometry is distinctive due to the presence of several ENE–WSW narrow rift basins, derived from major tectonic phases: pre-rift (that was linked with the Hercynian Orogeny); union (of Pangea in the Paleozoic); and syn-rift (that was developed mostly between the Late Permian–Late Triassic with several NE–SW to ENE–WSW rift-basins).  All derived from the almost coeval opening of the Atlantic Ocean and Tethys Sea. These rift-derived basins were filled with continental siliciclastic sediments, and later—toward the Rhaetian stage of the Triassic—affected by emissions of the Central Atlantic magmatic province. It was in the post-rift phase that the local tectonics had a thermal relaxation and allowed the deposition of the Jurassic–Cretaceous carbonate platforms.

The structure of the High Atlas can be defined by two main groups of faults—thrust and oblique-slip faults—that occur from E-W to NE-SW. The presence of tectonic inversion in the Atlas Mountains has shown that there are intracontinental mountain belts that appeared from the uplift of pre-existing rift systems, where here it is represented by a major rift system (~2000 km) originated in the Mesozoic, that was later uplifted and inverted in the Cenozoic. The impact and convergence movements of the African–Iberian plates after the Mesozoic end with an inversion of the previous deposited strata, transporting the sediments of that and forming new low angle thrusts. Triassic, Jurassic, and Cretaceous strata are confined within basins controlled by the extensional structures of the Mesozoic rift. The Jurassic basins can be grouped into two main provinces located on either side of an emerged Massif Ancien: west, where the basin was open to the Early Atlantic, being related to its passive margin; and east, with several epicontinental troughs connected to the Tethys Ocean.

Across the Toarcian–Bajocian strata, there was a great deposition of marine shales as marls, calciturbidites and reefal limestones, that were accumulated in the central High Atlas, while on the west margin—around the Massif Ancien terrestrial—especially fluvial sedimentation dominated. The present red beds of Azilal indicate various marine transgressions across the Toarcian–Aalenian boundary, after ending its sedimentation on the Bathonian.  For example, an initial tectonic event on the Triassic–Jurassic boundary led to the formation of the Tigrinine–Taabast pull-apart basin. Following this event, a major extensional tectonic activity (derived from the second Pangea rifting) occurred toward the end of the Pliensbachian and beginning of the Toarcian. This second major tectonic event developed toward the E-W to NE-SW, reactivating trending normal faults that led to the drowning of the Lower Liassic carbonate platform and the predominance of marls during the Middle Liassic to Toarcian.

Rift vulcanism 
Along the High Atlas Triassic–Jurassic boundary, and until the Bathonian stage of the Middle Jurassic (and again in the Lower Cretaceous), there is a record on vulcanism locally on the succession of different local formations, including the Azilal Formation and others, but absent on others such as the underlying Aganane Formation. Most of the North African Rhaetian–Bathonian volcanic events are related to the opening of the Atlantic Ocean, with parallel records found on the North American coast and other zones such as in Mexico. On some locations, such as Haute Moulouya, it is even possible to delimitate the transitions between the several Volcanic events that happened locally along the post Triassic–Jurassic boundary (belonging to the Tizi-n-Ghachou Formation). Most of the effects of the volcanism occur on the main emerged terrestrial deposits, where some of the near-shore strata were turned down due to tectonics, and hid after by volcanic eruptions of different grades, leading to different kinds of volcanic strata, as can be seen in the presence of basaltic intrusions in the younger Bathonian layers of the Beni-Mellal zone.

The origin of the volcanism is related to the Geography of the zone. On the Hettangian–Sinemurian there was a post-rift carbonate platform developed in the Atlas area that revealed older marine strata. On the Middle Toarcian, subsiding basins appeared which isolated Precambrian and Paleozoic massifs in the Mesetas area. Alkaline magmas overflowed and created the central High Atlas basin. These basins were fault-bounded basins, with variations of the sedimentary thicknesses and intra-formational breccias related to major blocks. The Magmatic Province of the Atlas influenced the deposition of the main strata, where the Terrestrial settings of some Formations (Including Azilal) were disposed over a series of cut-extensional-faults depicting a mosaic of horsts and grabens oriented to the east, northeast, and east–west, with the Middle Atlas among the main areas of subsidence. The Central Atlantic Magmatic Province continued to erupt around the Pliensbachian–Toarcian event about 183 Ma ago, overlapping the eruption of the Karoo–Ferrar igneous province. The central High Atlas recovers two sections of lava flows and dikes of 188-153 M.a and 199-178 M.a respectively, showing there were several coeval events developed locally when the Azilal Formation was deposited. These lava flows derived from several coeaval rifting events, with Middle to Late Toarcian vulcanism present but on smaller extension, as a proven Toundoute Continental Series Member.

Overall description

Locations at Adoumaz, Ghnim and Jbel Taguendouft in the Béni-Mellal Province, are the ones that originally provided a better view of the layers, sedimentation, lithology, and facies evolution. These main layers consist of a succession of reddish-brown tints with terrigenous dominance: Sandstone; clays with paleosols and sandstone Limestones (sometimes dolomitized); with marmorized levels in paleosols toward the northern region of Ghnim and Adoumaz. The lowermost sections show a transition from sandstone limestone and/or sandstone to clay, with a thin level of green marls locally rich in ostracods. These initial layers are followed by a subtidal term, represented by an oolitic limestone, with fine bivalve bioclasts and variable percentages of quartz, that also host small sections of sandstone with calcareous cement and rare oolites, representing this last one on an oblique bedding of metric dimensions, drawing on the surface mega-ripples of 3 – 5m in wavelength. The last major section represents a supratidal deposit, as shown by the presence of coarse sandstone gradually changing to red marls with "fluer" structures and locally to paleosols. This section in Adoumaz has an abundance of Paleozoic quartz grains, that are found organized in decametric channeling lenses evoking a predominantly fluvial dynamic.

Strata 
The layers at Azilal evolved along the central High Altas Pliens–Toarc carbonate platform, and consist of a succession of detritic rocks with red marls deposited on an alluvial environment occasionally interrupted by shallow marine incursions, a mudflat setting. The unit represents a major sea regression measured in the central High Atlas, especially after the Lower Toarcian, proven by sections such as "Tarhia n’Dadès", where the Pliensbachian Choucht Formation marginal marine layers are overlain by one meter of red silt/bioclastic limestone alternations, that start local paralic to continental environments, assigned to the Domerian Aganane Formation. Over this unit, the limit with the Azilal formation is marked with a karstified subaerial exposure surface, that contains a great abundance of plant material that overall implicates prograding terrestrial facies and a shrinking of the local carbonate platform width.

The flow of the fluvial-washed sediments takes place in a E-NE direction, being moved to the layers of the Tafraout Formation and other coeval marine units.  These are found on fluviatile channels inside the rocks of this unit. The lithology of the Azilal Formation recovers a Claystone-dominated interval, incised by metric dolomitized beds of Mudstones, Peloid-rich Packstones, Ooid-rich Grainstones, and Polymictic Conglomerates, all rich in terrestrial plant debris (mostly debris from ferns), with faunal content very poor and dominated by microbial facies. The Jbel El Abbadine zone provides the biggest outcrop of the parts of a Calcareous massif, with strata of the Late Lias. Most of this strata is recovered inside the Azilal Formation, with a succession of seashore and inland deposits. Several seismic events located on the Tethian realm where the main genesis of the Tectonic activity locally, with emerged strata from the Paleozoic, that was eroded due to the local conditions. On the Toarcian–Aalenian transgression, the High Atlas domain experienced a long process of extension and rifting, recorded by the presence of marine carbonates and shales. It is related to the formation of the Atlantic Rifting to the west and of the formation of the Tethys Ocean to the north.

The aftermath of the Toarcian Oceanic Anoxic Event is also highly present on the marginal marine strata of the formation, with the so-called Toksine Section, a succession of near shore marine strata disposed along the Toarcian boundary, where its last 40m belong to the lower part of the Azilal Formation and composed of dolomitized Mudstones and ooidal Grainstones, that show a slowly recovering low-depth nearshore marine environment occurred after the Pliensbachian–Toarcian boundary, indicated by a dramatic Tethys-wide collapse of the Neritic Carbonate System.

Toundoute Continental series 
The Toundoute Continental series lithology is divided into five units from D to H, (A–C represent the units of the underlying marine dolomite, with C representing a transition to the terrestrial environment). The Toundoute sector covers only the Middle to Late Toarcian, with an atypical paleogeographic element, located on the route of the South Atlas Accident, with several changes on the structure leading to show the instability of the deposit area. The formation shows the transition from carbonates to a series of continental detrital sediments, with palynomorphs and fossils. The presence of volcanic sedimentation is one of the most important aspects on the Toundoute strata. The fragments can come from a reworking of Triassic basalt flows, with most of the products homogeneous, probably of trachyandesitic nature. The deposits are young, probably related to the magmatism of the Middle Jurassic, with inflows probably contemporary with and related to eruptions, as in the case of many current volcanoes, in the form of dense flows. The tectonic processes on the high Atlas probably lead to most of the volcanic manifestations locally.

Stratigraphy
The formation is subdivided on several stratigraphic levels, starting with the so-called facies of term A, composed of gypsum and salt, from the Triassic age, supported by the presence of volcanic intercalations of basalt. Above that, there are carbonates of term B alternated at the first with dolomites, pelites and limestones along with marly-silt crimes with plant debris, which had regular influence of a marine environment. That is proved by the presence of ooids, oncoliths, debris of molluscs and benthic foraminifers, being dissolved and recrystallized as sparite. The third level shows a transition between marine and continental deposits, through carbonate palustrine levels and caliche horizons, being continental layers superimposed in stratigraphic continuity over the marine carbonates of the lower Lias (Sinemurian-Hettangian). Those continental layers are rich in coarse volcano-detrital episodes as result of a sedimentary process of high sedimentation rates, where the strata, including the deposit with dinosaur fossils, were deposited on a short time interval, where Middle Jurassic Bajocian-Bathonian carbonate levels, frequent within the Atlas domain, do not exist not in Toundoute. The sedimentation on the Toundoute member has some common characteristics, such as lenticular channels with sieve conglomerate of ~5 m thick (≤ 5m) for visible decametric, composed of several volcanic product materials: blocks of volcanic rocks such as sands made of feldspars; black ferruginous grains from the surface of volcanic rocks in dry periods; and siliceous green fragments from post-eruption processes (veins, microgeodes, nippled concretions).  Also limestone debris with traces of roots and cracks (where, in some parts, traces of dark fine bushy algae filaments are still visible, similar to the genus Girvanella of blue-green algae. Other materials include schist and vein quartz, without bone and wood debris with a good cellular structure. The floodplain-like deposits are divided into two parts, with hard limestone nodules, pink or brick and very irregular, typical of profiles of calcimorph soils formed in climates with pronounced dry phases. Those nodules had a visible reorganization in the channels, as a result of erosion of the alluvial plain by the fluvial network. Finally there are present interlays of fine sandstone often laminated that mark the flood facies from channels in period of flood, being composed only by plagioclase feldspars and in a lesser proportion of orthoclases, along with small ferruginous grains or fine silts of quartz. There is documentation of warm climatic conditions locally, that alternated with wet and dry periods, as is seen on the other formations.  This gave rise to soils with differentiated limestone profiles, such as pedogenetic nodules or caliche. The accumulation in the channels from calcimorphic soil profiles shows the presence of an active erosion on soils with probably sparse vegetation.

Wazzant series 
The Wazzant series cover a variation on the sedimentary process observed on the older and coeval Azmerai Formation, formed by a complex sedimentary unit, with terrigenous dominance, composed by abundance of conglomeratic channels with quartz dragees and elements of the Paleozoic basement, sandstone organized in channeling lenticular bars and red clays, all part of facies are organized into metric sequences of fill and alluvial channels. The fluvial system of the Wazzant formation was led by several minor freshwater currents, that were probably temporal and linked to rain seasons. The presence of many dwarf freshwater lamellibranchatia in the south of Azilal, the fine oblique stratifications, plant chaff and imprints of raindrops demonstrate that the fossilifeorus layers are of aquatic origin, maybe lagoonal, with temporary emersions as seen due to mudcracks in paleosoils. Several fish fossils have also been found. Along the meridional border of the Guettioua Formation, on the same stratigraphic tendence is developed a red sandstone-pelitic deposition, that changes from Quartzo-conglomerates to grains and fragments of quartz, disposed with liassic calcareous strata. is equivalent to the main Azilal "Marnes Chocolat". The main sector occurs near Acfarcid, with an exposure of ~800 m, recovering the most detritic sector. Along this exposure, the Wazzant member appears at the right lateral, along massive calcareous dolomites, over the latest Pliensbachian strata, where the lower Toarcian strata is missing. The Wazzant facies never exceed 50 m, getting its maximum exposure at the north of the Guettioua Formation. The facies of the formation follow a deposition typical of alluvial plains. It also recovers a succession of reddish brown tones predominantly terrigenous: conglomerates, sandstone, clays related to paleosoils, along with dolomitized limestone.

The Wazzant formation has a notorious proximal character compared to the Azilal formation. These deposits fill in many small tear pools in the central High Atlas. Only its stratigraphic framing allows to locate the formation in the Toarcian interval. The predominantly terrigenous deposits of this formation suggest they were deposited in continental setting. On the Toarcian-Aalenian transgression, the High Atlas domain experienced a long process of extension and rifting, recorded by the presence of marine carbonates and shales, found on the Wazzant Formation Beds. It is related to the formation of the Atlantic Rifting to the west and of the formation of the Tethys Ocean to the north.

Environment
The Azilal Formation represented diverse settings on the coast of the Toarcian Atlas basins, including continental river-dominated settings, parallic tide-dominated deposits and tidal mudflat shores. The sister Tafraout Formation on the other hand represented a marginal marine environment, with wave ripples, cross-bedding, the Amphipoda ichnofossil Arenicolites isp. and the calcareous algae Cayeuxia sp., all deposited on diagenetic mudstone. On Taguendouft the Azilal represent the uppermost formation where desiccation cracks are present, overlying marine deposits, indicating a local sea regression. The Parallic depostis host claystone intervals rich in continental organic matter such as wood debris, but scarce fossil fauna, composed by abundant algae, benthic foraminifera, common oncoids, gasteropods and bivalve bioclasts. At the Lowermost Toarcian on the region the carbonate platform was abruptly replaced by siliciclastic deposits and a rise on the ubiquitous occurrence of plant debris, with alternated nearshore-foreshore deposition settings. Is the overlied by storm-dominated deposits, with depauperate fauna and very common occurrence of plant debris, which along the increase of ooid-rich facies suggest the deposition on a warm humid climatic belt. Toward the Middle Toarcian the carbonate producers recovered locally, with the ooid grainstone replaced by wackestone to packstone beds, where heterotrophic faunal bioclasts increase, such as cephalopods, brachiopods, echinoderms, and gastropods, with occasional coral patch reefs. Parallel to this coastal development, increased continental weathering was measured on the layers, as proven by the increase of the coarse-siliciclastic input into the basin, the increased plat debris and the absence of evaporite-rich interval and semi-arid paleosoils. This intervals increased the nutrient levels locally, as proven by the high amount of Phosphorus along all the Atlas Basin. This siliciclastic beds have abundant metamorphic and igneous rock pebbles, implying that the material must be derived from Paleozoic or Proterozoic, the only ones of that nature on Morocco, that on the Atlas are located at the south in the Anti-Atlas, to the west in the Massif Ancien and Jebilet, and to the north in the Meseta Centrale, all locations that where subaerially exposed during the Jurassic. Concretely, the Anti-Atlas shows tectonic uplift, erosion of the overburden processes, that combined with the concentration of the coarse-siliciclastic material in the western part of the central High Atlas (absent in the eastern), suggests that this zone was the source for the Lower Toarcian weathered sediments, allowing to trace the fluvial channels that developed toward the Azilal Formation. The Azilal formation recovers, as seen on worldwide units an increase of weathering due to the Pl/To and T-OAE events, with increase of the siliciclastic sediment supply and increased dissolved material to the oceans. This occurred along an intensification of tropical storm events on the T-OAE, destroying the older carbonate platform organisms locally. This allowed to set the Azilal Formation environments, that range from a series of continental settings with river influence, increased during the T-AOE with more amounts of flora being washed, to nearshore deposits, parallic and subtidal, subject of storm and tropical storm events, all set in a warm humid climate.

There is also a local record of a cold snap, where the Akenzoud section, that has 182 section meters on the Azilal Formation, and shows that after cold event that affect the local waters, related to the Karoo and the Atlantic Rift volcanism the present Brachiopods, based on their preserved oxygen isotope data show that warm seawater temperatures re-established during the early Late Toarcian.

In the Middle Toarcian the eastern and north-eastern part of High Atlas of Todrha–Dadès, sedimentation carbonate with bioconstructions (patch-reef), developed with a thickening toward the east and a still thinning toward the west in the direction of the reef of Jbel Akenzoud, where the dew marine fossils of the formation are recovered.  The Coralline faunas suffered a significant collapse visible in the locality of Ouguerd Zegzaoune, showing that sedimentation at this time took place in a distensive tectonic context. Then, toward the Late Toarcian–Aalenian series correspond to detrital deposits with carbonate intercalations with neritic fauna. The structural analysis shows that the sedimentation during the upper Toarcian was controlled by a tectonic game, always distensive, causing the tilting of blocks along the transverse fault in a NW-SE direction, which leads to the creation of available space with openings always toward E and NE.

Coeval to this units, the western coast Amsittène Formation shows strong continental weathering, as cuts over the CAMP basalts and the triassic continental red beds. It recovers subaerial unconformity, with evidence for fluvial erosion, pedogenesis, or karstification, with a transition from flood plain to coastal plain deposits. This is interpreted as an alluvial fan to flood plain deposits, being on the Agadir sub-basin, more proximal, composed of braided river, flood plain, and alluvial fan deposits; while in Tikki it evolves vertically from a flood plain to alluvial fan deposits. The local alluvial system was probably related with activity along an ENE-WSW trending fault, parallel to the major Tizi N'Test fault that can be traced from the Argana Valley to the northeast of the Imouzzer Anticline (Tikki section displays paleocurrents toward the W-SW), and in the case of the Agadir deposits, from older highs, such as the Western Meseta and the Rehamna. The overlying coeval Ameskhoud Formation records a strong regression on the south of the Essaouira Basin dominated by fluvial deposits, with a few supratidal to the north. The large Variscan belt remains a potential source of sediments for the Toarcian braided river system in the Essaouira Basin.

Connection with lithiotid-coral reefs
The Azilal Formation lacks proper marine layers with the common "lithiotids" (an informal group of large, aberrant bivalves), that are known from the Sinemurian to Toarcian of Italy, Spain, Slovenia, Croatia, Montenegro, Albania and also in Morocco. These "reefs" had a strong zonation, starting with the bivalves Gervilleioperna and Mytiloperna, restricted to intertidal and shallow-subtidal facies. Lithioperna is limited to lagoonal subtidal facies and even in some low-oxygen environments. Finally Lithiotis and Cochlearites are found in subtidal facies, constructing buildups.  The Azilal Formation is connected with these types of deposits at least in the Jebel Toksine in the Dades Valley, which was deposited in the Tafraout sub-formation, developing local lagoonal-subtidal ecosystems under both arid and humid conditions. The Jebel Toksine layers represent one of the most complete records of this type of ecosystems in Morocco, recording multiple generations of lithiotid growth over ~1 km of exposure (composed of the genera Gervilleioperna, Mytiloperna, Lithioperna and Cochlearites), as well a diverse associated fauna, including udotacean algae (Cayeuxia); coralline red algae (Solenopora liasica); solitary corals (Archaeosmilia, Zardinophyllidae); phaceloid corals; Periseris (Thamnasterioidea corals); Hispaniastraea (Hispaniastraeidae); Ampakabastraea (Stylophyllidae); serpulid worm tubes; Arbaciidae echinoids; Scurriopsis Limpets; high-spired gastropods; plant root traces; coalified plant debris & wood logs.

The role of the Azilal Formation was likely similar to the Budoš Limestone, with—based on root accumulation—possible ephemeral mangrove-like environments in the Tafraout Formation and the Azilal representing the nearby dry inland setting. The study of this section also revealed that the beach to nearshore deposits of the formation were part of a storm-dominated platform. On the related strata there is a wide presence of storm events, as after the Toarcian AE and the rising of the temperatures on the late Toarcian the presence of ubiquitous storm deposits appear correlated to the warming of sea-surface temperatures, pointing to an intensification of tropical cyclones during the T-OAE and other warmer periods on the Toarcian.

Tazouda
The Duar of Tazouda layers start overlaying bioclastic limestones, indicative of a transgression surface toward continental deposits with both fluvial and volcanic-influenced alluvial sedimentation. The deposit represents a channel/floodplain type of fluvial system, with channels filled with sand and abundant in plant roots (mostly located in the fine limestone, probably from the channel margins), developed in a direction of transit close to E-W. The channels lithology host notable enrichment in material from the Paleozoic basement and from the Mesozoic cover. Interbedding with this layers, volcanic material from sand to pebbles, generally constituting more than half of the detrital components. These basaltic layers host fragments that show clear recrystallization of the carbonates, suggesting that these fragments were still at high temperature during deposition and, therefore, contemporaneous with sedimentation. Lithic elements or isolated crystals found locally do not show signs of prolonged transport, coming likely from relatively close sources, being later collected and transported by an undeveloped hydrographic network during episodic floods. The location has close marine influences, with intertidal sediments (stromatolites and algal matter) often highly developed.  The overall local climate was hot, with alternating wet and dry periods, having generated soils with differentiated limestone profiles (pedogenetic nodules, caliche), and having hosted active erosion on soils with sparse vegetation.

Cyanobacteria

Plantae
Paleobotany of the zone has shown that the layers at the Toundoute Continental Series there is not any major wood or plant macrofossils, although there is abundant infra-centimeter plant debris dispersed in the sediments. This debris is composed most probably Leaflets of Seed Ferns, and also on lesser quantities, Cycadophytas, most of them with preserved epidermis. Palynological analysis did not deliver any palynomorph, but the Plant debris left some Tracheids. On the debris, however, it was possible to isolate many wood debris, that was revealed to had characters such as Homoxylated structure apparently devoid of Parenchymas, with uniform rays, tracheids with uniseriate punctuation of the genus Abies (Abietoideae) and finally apex spiked type Oculipores vertically oriented, aspects typical from Coniferales, like Abietoideae, Pinaceae or Taxaceae. The Vegetation overall was apparently very dominant by ferns what indicates that may have been concentrated in punctual wetlands. The frequency in the sediments of the fine tuff debris shows the existence of more or less durable water points (spring tuffs) capable of maintaining sufficient humidity in the dry period. A possible correlative flora if found in the same age layers of the Mashabba Formation, North Sinai, Egypt, and is composed by the genera Equisetites (Equisetales), Phlebopteris and Piazopteris branneri (Matoniaceae). Other coeval flora includes the plants recovered on the Budoš Limestone.

Green algae

Pollen

Fossil wood 
This woody pieces are considered root fragments.

Invertebrates

Ichnofossils

Brachiopoda

Bivalves

Vertebrates 
Several scales and teeth of unidentified fish are known from Mizaguène Hill and the Acforcid quarry, coming from freshwater layers.

Actinopteri

Dipnomorpha

Theropoda

Sauropodomorpha

See also 
 Toarcian turnover

Notes

References 

Geologic formations of Morocco
Jurassic Morocco
Jurassic System of Africa
Toarcian Stage
Aalenian Stage
Sandstone formations
Conglomerate formations
Paleontology in Morocco